Zemmouri is a town and commune in Algeria.

It may also refer to: 

 Zemmouri El Bahri, a village in Algeria.
 2008 Zemmouri bombing, a terrorist attack in Algeria.